Concurrent ML (CML) is a concurrent extension of the Standard ML programming language characterized by its ability to allow programmers to create composable communication abstractions that are first-class rather than built into the language. The design of CML and its primitive operations have been adopted in several other programming languages such as GNU Guile, Racket, and Manticore.

Concepts

Many programming languages that support concurrency offer communication channels that allow the exchange of values between processes or threads running concurrently in a system. Communications established between processes may follow a specific protocol, requiring the programmer to write functions to establish the required pattern of communication. Meanwhile, a communicating system often requires establishing multiple channels, such as to multiple servers, and then choosing between the available channels when new data is available. This can be accomplished using polling, such as with the select operation on Unix systems.

Combining both application-specific protocols and multi-party communication may be complicated due to the need to introduce polling and checking for blocking within a pre-existing protocol. Concurrent ML solves this problem by reducing this coupling of programming concepts by introducing synchronizable events. Events are a first-class abstraction that can be used with a synchronization operation (called  in CML and Racket) in order to potentially block and then produce some value resulting from communication (for example, data transmitted on a channel).

In CML, events can be combined or manipulated using a number of primitive operations. Each primitive operation constructs a new event rather than modifying the event in-place, allowing for the construction of compound events that represent the desired communication pattern. For example, CML allows the programmer to combine several sub-events in order to create a compound event that can then make a non-deterministic choice of one of the sub-events. Another primitive creates a new event that will modify the value resulting from synchronization on the original event. These events embody patterns of communication that, in a non-CML language, would typically be handled using a polling loop or function with handlers for each kind of event.

Hello world
Here is a program that prints  to the console. It spawns one thread with a channel for strings, and another thread which prints a string received on the channel. It uses SML/NJ and CML. (Note that the heap name will be different on non linux-x86 platforms; you may need to change the line with "cml_test.x86-linux" to something different.)

External links
 The language homepage

References

Programming constructs
Programming language design
Concurrent programming languages
ML programming language family
Programming languages created in the 1990s